The 2019 Patriot League men's soccer tournament was the 30th edition of the Patriot League Men's Soccer Tournament. The tournament decided the Patriot League champion as well as the conference's automatic berth into the 2019 NCAA Division I men's soccer tournament. The tournament began on November 9 and concluded on November 16, 2019.

The defending champions, Colgate, were eliminated in the first round by eventual runners-up, Lafayette. Lehigh won the championship, 1–0, over Lafayette to claim their third Patriot League Tournament championship. There, Lehigh earned the conference's automatic bit in the NCAA Tournament. There, they were eliminated by Pittsburgh in the opening round.

Seeds

Bracket

Results

First round

Semifinals

Final

Patriot League Tournament Best XI 

MVP in Bold

References

External links 
 Patriot League Tournament

2019
2019 in sports in Maryland
2019 in sports in Pennsylvania
November 2019 sports events in the United States